Fuping may refer to:

 Chinese counties
Fuping County, Hebei (阜平县)
Fuping County, Shaanxi (富平县)

Chinese towns or subdistricts
 Fuping, Changde (府坪街道), a subdistrict in Wuling District, Changde City, Hunan Province
Fuping Town (阜平镇), a town which is the county seat of Fuping County, Hebei Province

a military service system in ancient China
Fu-Ping, Fubing system (府兵制), local militia system that existed in China between 6th and 8th century

Railway line
 Fuping Railway (Fuzhou-Pingtan Railway); see Pingtan Island